Envia garciai is a small (3 mm) pale yellow species of mygalomorph spider from Brazil. It is one of only two described species in the genus Envia.

They live in soil and litter of undisturbed rainforest, where they reach up to 17% of the local spider abundance, with 37 individuals found in one square metre.

According to the authors, the genus name is an arbitrary combination of letters. The species name is in honor of researcher Marcos Garcia.

References

 Ott, R. and Höfer, H. (2003). "Envia garciai, a new genus and species of mygalomorph spiders (Araneae, Microstigmatidae) from Brazilian Amazonia". Iheringia 93: 373-379. PDF.

Microstigmatidae
Spiders of Brazil
Spiders described in 2003